They Shall Have Music is a 1939 musical film directed by Archie Mayo and starring famed violinist Jascha Heifetz (as himself), Joel McCrea, Andrea Leeds, and Gene Reynolds. The screenplay concerns a young runaway who finds his purpose in life after hearing Heifetz play, and the kindly master of a music school in financial difficulty takes him in.

Plot
Youngster Frankie (Gene Reynolds) and his small gang commit petty crimes in their New York City tenement neighborhood, such as stealing bicycles and taking money from other boys.  One of those boys, Willy (Tommy Kelly), complains to his father about this, who takes the matter to Frankie's mother (Marjorie Main) and stepfather (Arthur Hohl). Frankie finds an old violin in his basement which he used to play when his father was around. He then pawns it to get some money to put in the gang's treasury.

One day, Frankie and his friend "Limey" (Terry Kilburn) hide from the police in the lobby of a concert hall. When a couple has an argument, the man disgustedly throws away his tickets. Unable to scalp them, the boys decide to attend the concert. Frankie is entranced by the virtuoso performance of Jascha Heifetz.  Later, he sees his violin in the window of a local pawn shop, and decides he wants it back. Frankie steals his little gang's stash of spare change to buy the violin, which he handles with aplomb back in his mother's kitchen. His stepfather comes home and believes Frankie stole it, smashes the instrument, and decides to pack him off to reform school. Frankie immediately runs away, putting his shoe shine gear into the empty violin case as his only possession.

He stumbles upon a music school for the poor, founded by Professor Lawson (Walter Brennan). Lawson discovers that Frankie has perfect pitch and instantly enrolls the boy. That night, Frankie sneaks into the basement to sleep, but Lawson finds him. After hearing his story, he lets Frankie stay.

Unbeknownst to Lawson, the school (which does not require tuition fees) is in financial trouble. The school's sponsor has died, and bills have gone unpaid for months. All of the musical instruments are rented from a stingy music store owner ironically named Mr. Flower (Porter Hall). Flower assigns one of his clerks, Peter (Joel McCrea), to collect payment, but Peter's girlfriend is Lawson's daughter, Ann (Andrea Leeds), so he does nothing. When Flower finds out, he fires Peter and goes to confront Ann.

Frankie overhears Peter and Ann discussing the situation, and organizes a street band with some of the other students to raise money. They set up right next to a concert hall where, according to clever Frankie, "people will like us." When Jascha Heifetz comes out of the hall, Frankie recognizes him and tells him about the school and the fund raising concert they have scheduled. Heifetz is impressed with Frankie and the story and offers to send a film of himself playing. Later, when Flower and the other creditors show up to collect payment, they get the mistaken impression that Heifetz is the school's new sponsor. Peter plays along to buy time, and even claims that the violinist will perform at the school's upcoming concert.

Suspicious, Flower goes to see Heifetz and discovers the truth. Limey and the rest of Frankie's old gang try to persuade Heifetz to come, but they are turned away without seeing him. Limey steals Heifetz's Stradivarius violin as a present for Frankie, unaware of its great value. When Frankie tries to return it, he is detained by the police but refuses to talk to anyone but Heifetz. When Heifetz shows up at the police station to collect his instrument, Frankie is able to persuade him to perform at the concert.  Heifetz plays to Flower and a rapt audience of the parents of the children, and it appears that the school will now be sponsored by Heifetz.

Cast

Jascha Heifetz as himself
Joel McCrea as Peter McCarthy
Andrea Leeds as Ann Lawson
Gene Reynolds as Frankie
Walter Brennan as Professor Lawson
Terry Kilburn as Limey
Porter Hall as Mr. Flower
Walter Tetley as Rocks Mulligan
Chuck Stubbs as Fever Jones
Tommy Kelly as Willie
Gale Sherwood as Betty (as Jacqueline Nash)
Alfred Newman as Musical Director
Mary Ruth as Suzie
John St. Polis as Davis
Alexander Schoenberg as Menken (as Alexander Schonberg)
Marjorie Main as Mrs. Miller
Arthur Hohl as Mr. Miller
Paul Harvey as Heifetz's Manager
Emory Parnell as Policeman in Rain

External links

The Official Website of American Violinist Jascha Heifetz

1939 films
1930s musical drama films
American musical drama films
Films directed by Archie Mayo
American black-and-white films
Films about classical music and musicians
Films about violins and violinists
Films scored by Alfred Newman
Samuel Goldwyn Productions films
United Artists films
1939 drama films
1930s American films